Sree Sankara Vidyapeetam or Sree Sankara Vidya Peetam (also called SSVP) is a senior secondary school located in Mattanur, Kerala, India. It is named after Shri Adi Shankara. The school was established in 1994, under the auspices of Mattanur Sree Mahadeva Kshethra Samithi and now it is run by Sree Mahadeva Educational Trust (Regd.) Mattanur.

This institution is the only one of its kind in Mattanur that follows the new pattern of education under 10+2 scheme and affiliated to C.B.S.E., Delhi vide Number 930349.

Overview
This institution is named to perpetuate the memory of the Acharya “Adi Sankara”. It follows the pattern of education under 10+2 scheme and affiliated to C.B.S.E., Delhi vide Number 930349

Courses Offered 
Standard I to XII is affiliated to C.B.S.E., Delhi. This school has a per-primary section having Play School, L.K.G. and U.K.G. classes.

Admission 
Admission to SSVP is open to students of all nationalities who demonstrate the ability to access and benefit from programme offered by the school.

Criteria for admission 
 Availability of seats in appropriate classes and programs
 Meeting all admission procedures and qualifications
 Meeting all financial obligations

Online services 
 Admission registration
 Fee payment
 Appy for TC

References

External links

 Details of School Affiliated to the Central Board of Secondary Education
 For more information visit School website

High schools and secondary schools in Kerala
Private schools in Kerala
Schools in Kannur district
Educational institutions established in 1994
1994 establishments in Kerala